The Odd Fellows Temple in East Liverpool, Ohio, was built in 1907.  It was listed on the National Register of Historic Places in 1985.

It was one of many buildings addressed in a study assessing historic resources in East Liverpool's central business district, a study resulted in the NRHP listing of several historic districts and buildings (including also Masonic Temple (East Liverpool, Ohio), Elks Club (East Liverpool, Ohio), and YMCA (East Liverpool, Ohio)).

References

Clubhouses on the National Register of Historic Places in Ohio
Buildings and structures completed in 1907
East Liverpool, Ohio
East Liverpool
Buildings and structures in Columbiana County, Ohio
National Register of Historic Places in Columbiana County, Ohio